The Catholic Church in the Isle of Man is part of the worldwide Catholic Church, under the spiritual leadership of the Pope in Rome.

Although not part of the United Kingdom, for geopolitical reasons the Isle of Man is part of the Archdiocese of Liverpool. There are Catholic churches in all of the main towns, the largest being St. Mary of the Isle in Douglas. A large percentage of the Catholics on the Isle of Man are Irish or of Irish descent.

History
Following the English Reformation the allegiance of the Manx church to Rome was broken and Catholic practices forbidden. The running trade however brought trading links with Ireland, France and other Catholic countries thus providing a nucleus for a small Catholic community.

At its most anti-Catholic period the English penal code stipulated perpetual imprisonment for saying Mass, declared Catholics incapable of purchasing or inheriting land and made the possession of a horse worth more than £5 a criminal offence. The Island did not follow these practices - until quite late in Elizabeth's reign the Earls of Derby were Catholic and did little to spread the reformation to the Island where it progressed relatively slowly. Though the Island displayed considerable religious toleration (however around the 1660s a small group of Maughold Quakers was persecuted) and had none of the penal laws about Catholics that so disfigured the English Statute book, they were of course required to obey the ecclesiastical laws of attendance at church, places of marriage and burial etc. (several Catholic priests were briefly imprisoned in the 18th century for illegally celebrating marriage), another was presented in 1759 for attending a non-Catholic.

From 1779 a Benedictine monk, Father Johnston, who served the mission at St. Begh's Whitehaven, started to make regular pastoral calls - he noted some 29 Catholics living on the Island. In 1789 an émigré priest, Father Louis, sought asylum on the Island; for a time he acted as tutor to the governor's and bishop's children whilst living at Castle Rushen. He would offer Mass in a barn at Scarlett or at the cottage of some Catholic family. He appears to have left the Island before 1794. Around the early 19th century an influx of Irish, fleeing the Irish rebellion of 1798, brought the number of Catholics up to around 200. One of these families, the Fagans, brought over their chaplain, Father Collins, who until his death in 1811 seems to have ministered to the Irish fishing community of Castletown. He is buried near St. Michael which appears to have been regularly used as a chapel.

The first priest to reside in Douglas was Father Miles McPharlan - as Rev Demsey says his story is not without interest and is also linked to the Dublin rising. Lieutenant Major Taubman (of the Nunnery family) and a contingent from the Manx Fencibles were sent to Dublin where Major Taubman was billeted in Fr McPharlan's rooms (though Peter Kelly in his History of St Mary's treats this as something of a myth). When Fr McPharlan fled to the Island around 1804, to escape debts incurred in setting up a brick factory for his Irish parish, he made contact with Major Taubman who gave a site, within a disused quarry on the Douglas-Castletown road, for a chapel. Eventually in 1814 the small chapel of St. Bridget was built though Fr McPharlan left for France to better escape his creditors.

The Irish Jesuit College, which had provided some earlier priests on a temporary basis, agreed to provide a resident priest in 1823 - this was Father Gahan, who also opened St. Mary's in Castletown. Along with Fr Gahan came John Kelly who taught at a school, St. Mary's, established in Douglas in 1824 which attracted both Protestants as well as Catholics becoming well known for many years for the breadth of its curriculum. Fr Gahan's generous Irish friends allowed the purchase of an old theatre at the corner of Athol Street and Prospect Hill which was adapted for use as Chapel and school in 1836. An additional footnote added to the second, 1841, edition of Quiggin's Guide noting this move stated that we are not aware of a single conversion of a native to Popery, having occurred on the Island. However Fr Gahan died in 1837 before the Church was fully ready, his memorial can be seen in the grounds of St. Mary's - he was accorded a full and generous tribute in the Mona's Herald - a letter to the Manx Liberal (dated 6 Oct 1837) however states that Fr Gahan's memorial in Krk Braddan had been repeated desecrated, mainly by chalked messages but also by scratching the stone.

On 29 July 1837 the Manx Liberal reported that

On Wednesday last, arrived from Liverpool, his Lordship the R. Rev. Doctor Brigs, R. C. Bishop of the northern district of England, accompanied by the Very Rev. Doctor Ewins, of Liverpool; and on the following day administered the sacrament of confirmation in the Church of St Francis Xavier, in Athol Street, the Rev. Messrs. Aylmer and M'Grath attending, where upwards of 110 children and adults were confirmed. 
The Irish famines of the 1840s further increased the Catholic population who towards the end of the century were swelled in the summer months by the every increasing tourists mainly from the North of England.

Post reformation the parishes became linked with Ireland, however since the 1850s, with the restoration of the English Hierarchy, the Island parishes were attached to the Archdiocese of Liverpool. Today, the Catholic Church on the Isle of Man is officially designated as Pastoral Area Twenty Four Under the Patronage of Saint Maughold.

External links
 https://web.archive.org/web/20160203001428/http://www.archdiocese-of-liverpool.co.uk/parishes/24isleofman.html

 
Isle of Man
Isle of Man
^